The 1986 Major League Baseball Draft was the 22nd MLB draft that took place in 1986. During this draft 21 future all-stars were drafted: Greg Swindell, Matt Williams, Kevin Brown, Gary Sheffield, Roberto Hernández, Jack Armstrong, Dean Palmer, Scott Cooper, Kent Bottenfield, Bo Jackson, Joe Girardi, Pat Hentgen, Tom Gordon, Steve Finley, Rod Beck, Chuck Knoblauch, Rick Reed, Paul Quantrill, John Olerud, Scott Erickson and Todd Jones.

First round selections

The following are the first round picks in the 1986 Major League Baseball draft.

Other notable players
Kirt Manwaring, 2nd round, 31st overall by the San Francisco Giants
Roger Pavlik†, 2nd round, 32nd overall by the Texas Rangers
Erik Hanson†, 2nd round, 36th overall by the Seattle Mariners
Kevin Tapani, 2nd round, 40th overall by the Oakland Athletics
Dave Hansen, 2nd round, 47th overall by the Los Angeles Dodgers
Todd Zeile, 2nd round, 55th overall by the St. Louis Cardinals
Jack Armstrong†, 3rd round, 58th overall by the San Francisco Giants, but did not sign
Dean Palmer†, 3rd round, 59th overall by the Texas Rangers
Tuffy Rhodes, 3rd round, 68th overall by the Houston Astros
Scott Cooper†, 3rd round, 69th overall by the Boston Red Sox
Reggie Jefferson, 3rd round, 72nd overall by the Cincinnati Reds
Scott Radinsky, 3rd round, 75th overall by the Chicago White Sox
Rudy Seánez, 4th round, 83rd overall by the Cleveland Indians
Kent Bottenfield†, 4th round, 96th overall by the Montreal Expos
Paul Sorrento, 4th round, 103rd overall by the California Angels
Mark Guthrie, 4th round, 104th overall by the St. Louis Cardinals, but did not sign
Bo Jackson†, 4th round, 105th overall by the Kansas City Royals
Xavier Hernandez, 4th round, 107th overall by the Toronto Blue Jays
Joe Girardi†, 5th round, 116th overall by the Chicago Cubs
Pat Hentgen†, 5th round, 133rd overall by the Toronto Blue Jays
Tom Goodwin, 6th round, 134th overall by the Pittsburgh Pirates
Eddie Taubensee, 6th round, 150th overall by the Cincinnati Reds
Tom Gordon†, 6th round, 157th overall by the Kansas City Royals
Chuck McElroy, 8th round, 192nd overall by the Philadelphia Phillies
Hal Morris, 8th round, 210th overall by the New York Yankees
Chuck Carr, 9th round, 228th overall by the Cincinnati Reds
Stan Belinda, 10th round, 238th overall by the Pittsburgh Pirates
Jeff Reboulet, 10th round, 247th overall by the Minnesota Twins
Lance Blankenship, 10th round, 249th overall by the Oakland Athletics
Mike Blowers, 10th round, 252nd overall by the Montreal Expos
Tom Lampkin, 11th round, 265th overall by the Cleveland Indians
Steve Finley†, 11th round, 268th overall by the Atlanta Braves, but did not sign
Darryl Hamilton, 11th round, 269th overall by the Milwaukee Brewers
Keith Lockhart, 11th round, 280th overall by the Cincinnati Reds
Willie Blair, 11th round, 289th overall by the Toronto Blue Jays
Rey Sánchez, 13th round, 319th overall by the Texas Rangers
Rod Beck†, 13th round, 327th overall by the Oakland Athletics
Scott Kamieniecki, 14th round, 366th overall by the New York Yankees
Greg Hibbard, 16th round, 417th overall by the Kansas City Royals
Tim Salmon, 18th round, 450th overall by the Atlanta Braves, but did not sign
Chuck Knoblauch†, 18th round, 452nd overall by the Philadelphia Phillies, but did not sign
Turner Ward, 18th round, 470th overall by the New York Yankees
Chris Hoiles, 19th round, 489th overall by the Detroit Tigers
Kevin Maas, 22nd round, 572nd overall by the New York Yankees
Rick Wilkins, 23rd round, 582nd overall by the Chicago Cubs
Rick Reed†, 26th round, 644th overall by the Pittsburgh Pirates
Paul Quantrill†, 26th round, 660th overall by the Los Angeles Dodgers, but did not sign
Cal Eldred, 26th round, 661st overall by the New York Mets, but did not sign
Ben McDonald, 27th round, 670th overall by the Atlanta Braves, but did not sign
John Olerud†, 27th round, 682nd overall by the New York Mets, but did not sign
Eric Anthony, 34th round, 795th overall by the Houston Astros
Scott Erickson†, 36th round, 821st overall by the New York Mets, but did not sign
Todd Jones†, 41st round, 864th overall by the New York Mets, but did not sign

† All-Star  
‡ Hall of Famer

Other professional athletes drafted
Johnny Johnson, 34th round, 796th overall by the Montreal Expos, but did not sign
Tony Meola, New York Yankees, did not sign

References 

Major League Baseball draft
Draft
Major League Baseball draft